Bahadur Huseynov (December 15, 1921-2016) was Meritorious Jurist of Azerbaijan, Major general.

Early life 
Bahadur Mammadgulu oghlu Huseynov was born on 15 December 1921 in Sharur city of Nakhchivan Autonomous Republic. When he was 3 years old, his family decided to move from Nakhchivan to Ganja in order to alleviate their hard living conditions regarding the financial status of family. In 1934 after graduation from secondary school in Ganja, Bahadur was accepted into Weaving College in the same city, and in 1938 he graduated from College and started his first job in the Weaving Factory. However, he was not satisfied with neither his level of education nor the job he was doing. During this period, Bahadur Huseynovs' elder brother Ahmad was doing his education in Kharkov. He was inviting Bahadur to Kharkov to continue his education further. Finally, in May 1939 Bahadur is decided to move to Kharkov.

Education 
In 1939, he was accepted into the foundation course in Institute of Electrotechnics in Kharkov and having graduated from foundation course he continued his education in Kharkov borders school named after F. E. Dzerjinski.

Career 
When World War II commenced, Bahadur completed his education, he was sent to the front as a captain of division in his junior grade lieutenant. He engaged in his first battle in direction of Smolensk within troop 908 of division 246 in 1941. Jr. Lieutenant B. Huseynov was severely wounded three times in a row during the bloody face-to-face battle. After being treated in Gorki city, he was sent to the lines of back-up army located in Georgia so that he could be sent from there to frontier. However, the brigade commands did not accept Bahadur's mobilization to frontier, when they heard that he graduated from border school and allocated him to Border Service Army located at Georgia.

Young officer served from 1942 to 1948 as a translator, officer and senior officer in various locations of Georgia. From 1948 to 1963 he was serving as a chief of department and reconnaissance chief of department in Border Service Army of division 43 of Azerbaijan Republic. During that period, more precisely in 1961, he got accepted into Law faculty of Azerbaijan State University (currently Baku State University) and graduated from university in 1967 without leaving his service at army.

From 1948 to 1960 he was promoted up to the Lieutenant Colonel rank. Briefly after that, he was appointed to the deputy of head in military unit where he was serving. It was 1963. While serving in a Border Service Army, Azerbaijani Lieutenant Colonel B. Huseynov was highly differed with his interest to job and his attitude and was noticed by great leader Haydar Aliyev. He was brought to the State Safety Committee. Later, he was appointed as a head of department on the initiative of Haydar Aliyev. In 1969, Bahadur Huseynov was sent to the State Safety Committee of Nakhchivan Autonomous Republic as a chairman after having interesting life time in a special governmental services in the positions of operating attorney, chief operating attorney and head of department.

After serving with honor in the last position for 7 years, B. Huseynov became modest public figure and well-known militant in republic due to working with dignity. In 1976, Colonel Bahadur Huseynov was appointed as a deputy chairman to the Azerbaijan SSC on the suggestion of Haydar Aliyev and Azerbaijan CP CC (Communist Party Central Committee). All of these were related to the great trust of ex-president Haydar Aliyev to him. Because, he was hard-working, brave, respectful to the loyal people and was appreciating and supporting those people who also have these characteristics. In 1978, the deputy chairman of Azerbaijan State Safety Committee Bahadur Huseynov was promoted to the Brigadier General rank. He was retired in 1986.

During the servicing years, he was selected as the Deputy for Goytepe village council, Jalilabad village hard-working deputies council, Nakhchivan Autonomous Republic supreme council and was appointed as a representative of Azerbaijan CP assemblies and became a member of Baku city Party Committee. During 1991-2001, he was a member of presidium of relation council in veterans organization of CIS (Commonwealth of Independent States) countries. Azerbaijan veterans organization became a part of Worldwide Veterans Federation on initiative of Bahadur and he became a first Azerbaijani member of this organization.

Two times "Girmizi Emek Bayragi" order, I and II degrees "Veten Muharibesi" order, nearly 30 medals (two medals for distinction in battles, "G.K.Jukov" and "Distinction in defense of State borders" medals and some others) were granted to General Bahadur Huseynov as a Governmental awards due to his hard and glorious contribution. In 1981, General Secretary of Communist Party of Soviet Union Leonid Brejnev awarded Bahadur Huseynov a watch with his signature on it. Bahadur was also granted "Thanksgiving" award from executive secretary of Executive Committee of CIS countries due to his active international participation among war veterans.

He was Honored Lawyer of Azerbaijan Republic and honorable Chekist of former USSR. He was also awarded with Mongolia Republic Nation signs. Two times honorable order of Azerbaijan Republic and three times of Nakhchivan AR was granted to Bahadur due to his achieved results and active contribution into socio-political life of Republic. In addition, precious gifts of SSC (State Safety Committee) of USSR head department of Borders Army and SSC of Azerbaijan were given to Bahadur for his special contribution.

He was one of the creators of Veterans Organization in Republic. He was working in the positions of responsible secretary, deputy chairman of the board and from 1992 to 2001 as a chairman of the board in Veterans Council. He died on 31 December 2016 in Baku.

Family 
Bahadur Huseynov was part of a happy family. He had three children and seven grandchildren.

External links 
 "Role of women on front and rear during WW II" 
 All veterans of the World War II of Azerbaijan
 Azerbaijani Generals and Admirals, Military Leaders and Heroes
 Azerbaijani war veterans appeal to Pope Francis

See also 
World War II

References 

1921 births
2016 deaths
Azerbaijani generals
Azerbaijani jurists
People from Sharur
Soviet generals
Soviet military personnel of World War II